Arshad Ayub  (born 2 August 1958) is a former Indian cricketer who played in 13 Test matches and 32 One Day Internationals from 1987 to 1997. In January 2010, he became the manager for the Indian Cricket team for the series held in Bangladesh and for the world cup 2015 in Australia.  He is the former president of HCA.

Ayub was born in Hyderabad, Andhra Pradesh. He made his debut at Delhi against West Indies in 1987–88. As West Indies chased down 276 in the fourth innings Ayub had put up a lone battle, picking up four of the five West Indian wickets to fall. 
Children - Amal Ayub, Ambreen Ayub, Ammaar Ayub, Aaqib Ayub.

Arshad Ayub Cricket Academy

Arshad Ayub Cricket Academy [AACA] was formed in the year 1998 in the Masab Tank area of Hyderabad by Arshad Ayub himself. Since then the academy has contributed many players at all levels from under 14 to Ranji trophy. 2013 witnessed 20 players from the academy representing Hyderabad state teams right from under 14, under 16, under 19 under 22 and Ranji Trophy.

Arshad studied at All Saints High School, Hyderabad.

References

External links
 
 That's page on Arshad Ayub

1958 births
India One Day International cricketers
India Test cricketers
Indian cricketers
South Zone cricketers
Hyderabad cricketers
Living people
Cricketers from Hyderabad, India
Alumni of All Saints High School, Hyderabad